Munich-Allach station is a railway station in the Allach-Untermenzing borough of Munich, Germany.

It is on the Munich - Ingolstadt route, and the first train was seen here in 1867. It is connected to the locomotive factory in the East, formerly Kraus-Maffei, now Siemens Mobility production.

The station is served by the Munich S-Bahn's S2 line.  The line connects Allach to Munich Eastern Station (München Ost), ending in Altomünster or Petershausen in the Northwest, or Erding in North-East.

References

External links

Munich S-Bahn stations
Railway stations in Bavaria
Railway stations in Germany opened in 1867
1867 establishments in Bavaria